Finders Keepers is a crime novel by American writer Stephen King, published on June 2, 2015. It is the second volume in a trilogy focusing on Detective Bill Hodges, following Mr. Mercedes. The book is about the murder of reclusive writer John Rothstein (an amalgamation of John Updike, Philip Roth, and J. D. Salinger), his missing notebooks, and the release of his killer from prison after 35 years. The book's cover was revealed on King's official site on January 30. An excerpt was published in the May 15, 2015 issue of Entertainment Weekly.

Plot
In 1978, petty criminal Morris Bellamy and two of his friends break into the home of author John Rothstein, an author famous for his "Jimmy Gold Runner" trilogy, who lives a reclusive lifestyle away from civilization. They hurt him badly before demanding to know where he keeps his cash. Although Rothstein tries to lie to them by saying he only keeps petty amounts of cash in his house, they find his safe and force him to give them the combination, discovering a small fortune of cash and a large amount of notebooks. Rothstein pleads with them and tells them they can keep the cash as long as they leave the notebooks, but Morris tells the others to take everything. Rothstein begins to insult Morris and, much to the disapproval of the others, Morris kills him. When they are driving away, the thieves reach a deserted rest area and Morris tells them to pull over. When they get out, Morris kills both of them and drives to his estranged mother's house, who is currently away for the semester lecturing in history.

The next morning, Morris goes to see an old friend Andrew "Andy" Halliday to show him the notebooks, and Andy immediately confronts him about what he has done. When Morris asks him how long he should wait until they are able to start selling the notebooks to private collectors, Andy tells him to wait until the turn of the twenty-first century, to hide the notebooks and stay away from him, or he will call the police. That night, Morris puts the cash and notebooks in a trunk and buries them underneath a tree behind the house and goes to a bar. Later, he wakes up in a jail cell, having no memory of what happened and wonders if he was arrested for the murders of Rothstein and his friends, but he later finds out that he violently attacked and raped a woman while he was drunk. Morris pleads guilty in the hopes of getting a reduced sentence but is given life sentence instead. Years pass and his parole hearings are constantly always rejected until in 2014, when he is granted parole. 

In 2010, Pete Saubers (who is now living in Morris Bellamy's childhood home) is struggling at home with his parents fighting all the time due to their financial problems as his father is no longer working and needs constant physiotherapy sessions due to being injured in the Mercedes Massacre two years prior. While his parents were arguing, Pete left the house and went out the back path towards the creek. While sitting on a log by the creek, he sees the trunk buried underneath the roots of the tree. Pete then fakes being sick to get a day off school and goes back to the tree with a shovel to dig up the trunk and discovers the cash and notebooks. Over the next few years, he starts anonymously sending envelopes to his parents every month with $500 in them and their lives drastically improve and their father is finally able to secure a job at a real estate firm. He also starts reading the notebooks and becomes a fan of the Jimmy Gold character. When he looks into the author of the notebooks, he finds out that he was murdered and it was never solved but figures as it has been so long since it happened, the culprit is almost certainly dead or in prison for life.

The money Pete has been sending to his parents finally runs out after a few years and he looks into how he can sell some of the notebooks. He goes to his favourite teacher Mr. Ricker saying he has a first edition of a Rothstein book and he wants to sell it. Pete shows him a list of book dealers which includes Andrew Halliday, asking him which would be best and Mr. Ricker warns to him to stay away from Halliday as he has a reputation for selling stolen property. 

Pete goes to Halliday's shop using a fake name, showing him scanned copies of some of the pages of Rothstein’s notebooks. Halliday, who is deeply in debt, immediately recognizes them and tells him to bring them the next time he comes, realizing they are worth a fortune. Halliday manages to find out Pete's real name and the next time Pete goes to see Halliday, he blackmails him, telling him to give him the notebooks or he will report him to the police. Pete then goes home and hides the notebooks in the basement of a property his father is currently selling that was once a recreation center.

Pete's sister Tina, who always suspected it was Pete sending the money, notices how distressed he has been lately and goes to her friend Barbara (Jerome's younger sister and survivor of Brady Hartsfield) who takes her to Bill Hodges and Holly Gibney. She tells them she thinks her brother stole the money to help their parents. However, Hodges and Holly are more confident that he found it and ended up in trouble as a result.

Unbeknownst to Halliday, Morris has recently been paroled and found the empty trunk and now suspects Halliday of stealing the notebooks as he was the only person who knew about them. Morris goes to Halliday's shop with an axe and threatens to kill him if he doesn't tell him where the notebooks are but after he tells him about Pete, he kills him anyway.

Hodges waits outside the school for Pete and questions him but he refuses to tell him anything. They follow him but he manages to lose them and goes to Halliday's shop to tell him he is not giving him notebooks but finds Morris there instead waiting for him and narrowly manages to escape. Pete finally calls Hodges for help and they start driving towards his house.

Morris then shoots Pete's mother Linda and kidnaps Tina. He takes her to the recreation center (not knowing the notebooks are hidden there) and calls Pete telling him to call him once he has the notebooks. Pete goes to the recreation center to retrieve them but when he discovers that Morris is there with Tina, he throws the notebooks on the floor, pours lighter fluid on them and threatens to drop his lighter on them if he doesn't let Tina go. When Hodges, Holly and Jerome get to Pete's house they find his badly injured mother who tells them where Pete has gone. Hodges and Jerome make their way to the recreation center while Holly stays with Linda. When Hodges gets to the recreation center and finds Morris at the stairs of the basement, he throws a pair of shoes to create a distraction and then tackles him which causes Pete to jerk and drop the lighter, setting the notebooks alight. Morris goes to the notebooks to try to save them but dies in the blaze. Tina, Pete and Hodges manage to escape out the basement window with the help of Jerome.

The novel ends with Hodges going to see Brady Hartsfield in the hospital and the picture of Hartsfield and his mother mysteriously falls over while he is there. After Hodges leaves, the tap turns on and then off and the picture falls over again.

Reception

Finders Keepers received mixed to positive reviews. In her review for The Guardian, Alison Flood praised the book as "expertly plotted" and a "fresh take" on one of King's favorite subjects – "the relationship between a writer and their fans."  Janet Maslin of The New York Times wrote that while Finders Keepers "feels very much like a middle volume," it was still a page-turner, and praised the jumps between time periods and the "very appealing trio of crime-solvers who joined forces in 'Mr. Mercedes.'" Nick Romeo of The Boston Globe was more critical, faulting the "somewhat outlandish plot" and how "Deeper themes about the power of fiction feel somewhat grafted onto the suspenseful story."

Television adaptation

The third season of Mr. Mercedes retains the title from the first Bill Hodges book, and follows the events from Finders Keepers. As of April 2020 the TV show has an uncertain future, as the Audience Network closed and it was uncertain whether the show would return for a fourth season.

References

2015 American novels
Novels by Stephen King
American novels adapted into television shows